The National Defense Mobilization Department of the Central Military Commission  is the chief organ under the Central Military Commission of the People's Republic of China. It was founded on January 11, 2016, under Xi Jinping's military reforms. 
Its current director is Lt. Gen. Sheng Bin.

References

See also 

 Central Military Commission (China)
 National Defense Mobilization Commission

Central Military Commission (China)
Defence agencies of China
Government agencies established in 2016
2016 establishments in China